The Men's 2000 European Amateur Boxing Championships were held in Tampere, Finland from May 13 to 21. The tournament served as a qualification event for the 2000 Summer Olympics in Sydney, Australia.

Medal winners

External links
Results
EABA Boxing

E
European Amateur Boxing Championships
B
European Amateur Boxing Championships, 2000
Sports competitions in Tampere
May 2000 sports events in Europe